Frank Bealle Stephens (May 2, 1889 - March 16, 1962) was a Democratic member of the Mississippi House of Representatives, representing Clay County, from 1916 to 1920.

Biography 
Frank Bealle Stephens was born on May 2, 1889, in Griffith, Clay County, Mississippi. He was the son of James L. Stephens and Addie (Burnitt) Stephens. His maternal grandmother's uncle (Frank's great-granduncle) was Thomas Clingman. He ran for the Mississippi House of Representatives to represent Clay County in 1911, but lost. However, he was elected in November 1915, along with Barney Semmelman. He was married to Lauraetta Hudson. He died in Jackson, Mississippi, on March 16, 1962.

References 

1889 births
1962 deaths
Democratic Party members of the Mississippi House of Representatives
People from Clay County, Mississippi